The Academia Mexicana de la Historia (Mexican Academy of History, also known by the acronym AMH) is a national academy in Mexico, whose purpose is to promote and propagate historical studies within Mexico, conduct research into all aspects of the history of Mexico, and to contribute towards the preservation of the national cultural heritage. It is a correspondent academy to the Real Academia de la Historia in Madrid, the equivalent national academy of history in Spain.

The AMH was formally constituted on September 12, 1919, after several previous attempts to form such a body had not come to fruition. Originally the AMH was established with 24 positions or numbered chairs (sillones de número) for full members (académicos de número). In 1990 this number was increased to 30, made up of 22 members resident in Mexico City (miembros residentes) and 8 external members from the Mexican states (miembros foráneos). In addition, there are a number of correspondent members (corresponsales) from both within Mexico (corresponsales nacionales) and from other countries (corresponsales extranjeros).

Members
Josefina Muriel, 1993 (seat 27)
Leonardo López Luján, 2010 (seat 27)

References

External links
 Academia Mexicana de la Historia, official website 

Mexico
History institutes
Mesoamerican studies
History organizations based in Mexico
Historic center of Mexico City
Organizations established in 1919
1919 establishments in Mexico